Kevin Thomson (born September 2, 1995) is an American football quarterback for the Philadelphia Stars of the United States Football League (USFL). He played college football for UNLV, Sacramento State, and Washington and has also spent time with the BC Lions of the Canadian Football League (CFL).

Early life and high school career
Thomson was born on September 2, 1995, in Auburn, Washington. He attended Auburn Riverside High School where he played football and baseball.

In Thomson's senior season, he led the football team to a 7–3 record and the league championship, while throwing for 1,656 yards and 15 touchdowns, in addition to 553 rushing yards. He was named the SPSL North Offensive Back of the Year and also earned first-team All-SPSL North honors. He signed a letter of intent to attend University of Nevada, Las Vegas (UNLV) in February 2014.

College career

UNLV 
Thomson redshirted his first year at UNLV after undergoing Tommy John surgery. He spent the 2015 season as a backup, but did not appear in any games.

Sacramento State 
Thomson transferred to Sacramento State University in 2016, but sat out his first season there due to an injury. He gained the starting job in 2017 and threw for 1,828 yards and 17 touchdowns with only three interceptions. In the fourth game of the 2017 season, against Southern Utah, Thomson set a school record by accounting for seven total touchdowns, four rushing and three passing, while being named STATS National Player of the Week.

As a sophomore in 2018, Thomson completed 79-of-145 passes for 1,380 yards and eight touchdowns with only one interception, while playing in seven games. As a junior, he started 12 out of 13 matches and threw for 3,216 yards and 27 touchdowns, in addition to rushing for 619 yards and 12 scores, placing second all-time in school history for single season yards of offense. He led them to a 9–4 record and their first ever playoff appearance, while being named the Big Sky Conference Offensive Player of the Year and a second-team All-American by Phil Steele.

Washington 
Thomson transferred to the University of Washington in 2020, finishing his stint at Sacramento State with 6,424 passing yards and 52 touchdowns, in addition to 1,247 rushing yards and 21 touchdowns. He competed with Dylan Morris, Ethan Garbers and Jacob Sirman for the starting job before ultimately suffering a season-ending injury. Although given one final year of eligibility due to the COVID-19 pandemic, Thomson decided to try to play professionally rather than play an eighth season of college football.

Statistics

Professional career
After going unselected in the 2021 NFL Draft, Thomson received a rookie mini-camp invite from the Carolina Panthers, but was not signed.

BC Lions 
In October 2021, Thomson was signed by the BC Lions of the Canadian Football League (CFL). He appeared in two games during the 2021 season, but recorded no statistics. In , Thomson battled Michael O'Connor for the second-string quarterback spot. He was said to have impressed the team, but suffered a serious injury in preseason on a controversial hit by Titus Wall and was released after appearing in only one game.

Philadelphia Stars 
On November 9, 2022, Thomson was signed by the Philadelphia Stars of the United States Football League (USFL).

References

Notes

Citations

1995 births
Living people
American football quarterbacks
Canadian football quarterbacks
People from Auburn, Washington
Players of American football from Washington (state)
Players of Canadian football from Washington (state)
UNLV Rebels football players
Sacramento State Hornets football players
Washington Huskies football players
BC Lions players
Philadelphia Stars (2022) players